Ulyanovka is the name of several inhabited localities in Russia.

Urban localities
Ulyanovka, Leningrad Oblast, an urban-type settlement under the administrative jurisdiction of Ulyanovskoye Settlement Municipal Formation in Tosnensky District of Leningrad Oblast

Rural localities
Ulyanovka, Karmaskalinsky District, Republic of Bashkortostan, a village in Nikolayevsky Selsoviet of Karmaskalinsky District of the Republic of Bashkortostan
Ulyanovka, Kuyurgazinsky District, Republic of Bashkortostan, a village in Taymasovsky Selsoviet of Kuyurgazinsky District of the Republic of Bashkortostan
Ulyanovka, Belgorod Oblast, a khutor in Golofeyevsky Rural Okrug of Volokonovsky District of Belgorod Oblast
Ulyanovka, Chuvash Republic, a settlement in Bakhtigildinskoye Rural Settlement of Batyrevsky District of the Chuvash Republic
Ulyanovka, Kaliningrad Oblast, a settlement under the administrative jurisdiction of the town of oblast significance of Ladushkin, Kaliningrad Oblast
Ulyanovka, Kursk Oblast, a village in Olkhovsky Selsoviet of Khomutovsky District of Kursk Oblast
Ulyanovka, Lipetsk Oblast, a village in Lebyazhensky Selsoviet of Izmalkovsky District of Lipetsk Oblast
Ulyanovka, Ardatovsky District, Republic of Mordovia, a village in Silinsky Selsoviet of Ardatovsky District of the Republic of Mordovia
Ulyanovka, Atyashevsky District, Republic of Mordovia, a settlement in Sabancheyevsky Selsoviet of Atyashevsky District of the Republic of Mordovia
Ulyanovka, Moscow Oblast, a village in Provodnikovskoye Rural Settlement of Kolomensky District of Moscow Oblast
Ulyanovka, Nizhny Novgorod Oblast, a village in Deyanovsky Selsoviet of Pilninsky District of Nizhny Novgorod Oblast
Ulyanovka, Novosibirsk Oblast, a selo in Krasnozyorsky District of Novosibirsk Oblast
Ulyanovka, Omsk Oblast, a selo in Bogoslovsky Rural Okrug of Omsky District of Omsk Oblast
Ulyanovka, Korsakovsky District, Oryol Oblast, a village in Maryinsky Selsoviet of Korsakovsky District of Oryol Oblast
Ulyanovka, Kromskoy District, Oryol Oblast, a village in Shakhovsky Selsoviet of Kromskoy District of Oryol Oblast
Ulyanovka, Belinsky District, Penza Oblast, a village in Pushaninsky Selsoviet of Belinsky District of Penza Oblast
Ulyanovka, Kuznetsky District, Penza Oblast, a selo under the administrative jurisdiction of  the work settlement of Yevlashevo in Kuznetsky District of Penza Oblast
Ulyanovka, Tamalinsky District, Penza Oblast, a selo in Ulyanovsky Selsoviet of Tamalinsky District of Penza Oblast
Ulyanovka, Perm Krai, a village in Chernushinsky District of Perm Krai
Ulyanovka, Ryazan Oblast, a village in Mushkovatovsky Rural Okrug of Ryazansky District of Ryazan Oblast
Ulyanovka, Samara Oblast, a settlement in Koshkinsky District of Samara Oblast
Ulyanovka, Georgiyevsky District, Stavropol Krai, a settlement in Ulyanovsky Selsoviet of Georgiyevsky District of Stavropol Krai
Ulyanovka, Mineralovodsky District, Stavropol Krai, a selo in Ulyanovsky Selsoviet of Mineralovodsky District of Stavropol Krai
Ulyanovka, Kirsanovsky District, Tambov Oblast, a selo in Sokolovsky Selsoviet of Kirsanovsky District of Tambov Oblast
Ulyanovka, Uvarovsky District, Tambov Oblast, a village in Moiseyevo-Alabushsky Selsoviet of Uvarovsky District of Tambov Oblast
Ulyanovka, Republic of Tatarstan, a selo in Cheremshansky District of the Republic of Tatarstan
Ulyanovka, Kamensky District, Tula Oblast, a village in Galitsky Rural Okrug of Kamensky District of Tula Oblast
Ulyanovka, Leninsky District, Tula Oblast, a village in Rozhdestvensky Rural Okrug of Leninsky District of Tula Oblast
Ulyanovka, Venyovsky District, Tula Oblast, a village in Metrostroyevsky Rural Okrug of Venyovsky District of Tula Oblast
Ulyanovka, Tver Oblast, a village in Palchikhinskoye Rural Settlement of Maksatikhinsky District of Tver Oblast
Ulyanovka, Tyumen Oblast, a village in Pervovagaysky Rural Okrug of Vagaysky District of Tyumen Oblast
Ulyanovka, Ulyanovsk Oblast, a village under the administrative jurisdiction of  Leninsky Settlement Okrug in Baryshsky District of Ulyanovsk Oblast
Ulyanovka, Vologda Oblast, a village in Pertsevsky Selsoviet of Gryazovetsky District of Vologda Oblast
Ulyanovka, Borisoglebsky Urban Okrug, Voronezh Oblast, a selo under the administrative jurisdiction of Borisoglebsky Urban Okrug in Voronezh Oblast
Ulyanovka, Repyovsky District, Voronezh Oblast, a khutor in Skoritskoye Rural Settlement of Repyovsky District of Voronezh Oblast
Ulyanovka, Zabaykalsky Krai, a selo in Shilkinsky District of Zabaykalsky Krai